Nek'uf ujas, nek'uf at (Kinda Horror, Kinda Hell) is the second album by the Bulgarian punk rock band Hipodil, released in 1994, the band's first under the Riva Sound label. The album followed Hipodil's debut effort from 1993 Alkoholen delirium (Alcoholic Delirium).

History 
After the massive success of Hipodil's previous album, the band had to use the momentum and offer a consistent second product. Though this time recording and production work were better, Hipodil cleverly chose to copy the winning formula of their debut instead of searching for a new direction. Yet, Hipodil vocalist and frontman Svetoslav Vitkov put a lot of references to his favourite heavy metal influences and especially Slayer in the record. The others in the band however did not like his ideas about the projected style of the album and this ignited a quarrel, which almost led to Vitkov's departure from Hipodil.

As the band had not enough time to work on their far less-than-perfect music skills after the extensive national tour in support of Alkoholen delirium, they put their money on more explicit lyrics, based on a broader range of topics which Bulgarian society at the time offered in abundance. They also changed their label and moved to Riva Sound.

In early 1995, Hipodil launched a long national tour to support the album which took them to some 20 cities across Bulgaria. During most of the tour, vocalist Svetoslav Vitkov suffered from sore throat and, reportedly, on many dates guest keyboard player Ventsislav Mitzov backed him heavily with the vocal parts.

Commercially, the album was very successful, though it did not produce any radio hits and no videos, chiefly due to the obscene lyrics. No official sales figures were ever released, a usual practice in Bulgarian music industry.

Nek'uf ujas, nek'uf at was released on audio cassettes only and was never re-released on a CD though some tracks were included in the band's greatest hits compilation Tu'pest in 1999 and its sequel Tu'pest 2 in 2009. Presently, the album is out of print and new copies cannot be purchased anywhere, however it is available for streaming and digital download on various sites. Amazon also offers print-on-demand CDs of the album.

The Music 
Despite some darker tunes and more depressive lyrics, the band stayed true to their mix of puns, mockery and parodies. Of course, the album has enough songs of Hipodil's trademark party-oriented, sex & alcohol-based lyrics and a lot of mockeries, especially with the gay society in "Jenite sa za pederasi" (Women Are for Gays) and with the then-popular Bulgarian pop duet Doni & Momchil in "Moni i Domchil" (the song begins with a Slayer riff after the intro part, which is a parody of the Doni & Momchil song "Umoreni krila"). In "Jenite sa za pederasti", there is a motif from the Judas Priest's anthem "Breaking the Law", expressively added in honour of the British band's frontman Rob Halford. "Hipodili" (Hipodils) was inspired by the mass disorder at a Hipodil's concert in Varna in 1993, during the Alkoholen delirium tour, when all band members along with some people from the audience were arrested. (The reasons for the rout were not clear but the band has repeatedly stated that alcohol was in the base of the problem.) The song became some kind of an anthem and emblem of the band and a gig favourite.

Tracks

Side A 
 "Vhod" (Entrance)
 "Koy namaza sus layna" (Who Smeared with Shit)
 "Kut kokoshchitze..." (Cluck-cluck, little hen...)
 "Oteche" (Swelled)
 "More ot alkohol" (Sea of Alcohol)
 "Jenite sa za pederasi" (Women Are For Gays)
 "Zaplaha za izbivane na zab" (A Threat To Knock Out a Tooth)
 "Oblatzi" (Clouds)
 "Mrusen gaden den" (Dirty Nasty Day)
 "Ivo"

Side B 
 "Moni i Domchil" (parody of Bulgarian pop group Doni i Momchil)
 "Hipodili" (Hipodils)
 "L.A.-no mome" (L.A. Woman, also pun on the name of the Eastern South Slavic folk song "Eleno, mome" [Elena, my girl])
 "Takovata" 
 "Sedya na bara" (Sitting at The Bar)
 "Djudjanka" (Dwarf-woman)
 "Snejanka" (Snow White)
 "Psiho" (Psycho)
 "Galileo, Galileo"
 "Birata se lee" (The Beer is Flowing)

Personnel 
 Svetoslav Vitkov - vocals
 Petar Todorov - guitars
 Vencislav Lozanov - bass guitar
 Lachezar Marinov - drums

External links
 Nekuf ujas, nekuf at Discogs

Hipodil albums
1994 albums